The United Church of Christ in Mission Hill, South Dakota is a church which was built in 1913.  It was added to the National Register of Historic Places in 1980.

Description 
It is an L-shaped church with a square tower in the elbow of the plan.

History 
The property was deeded to the church in 1889, and a first church was built on the location thereafter.  The present church is a replacement for the first building.

References

External links

Churches in South Dakota
Churches on the National Register of Historic Places in South Dakota
Churches completed in 1913
Churches in Yankton County, South Dakota
1913 establishments in South Dakota
National Register of Historic Places in Yankton County, South Dakota